Ahmadabad-e Etemad ol Dowleh (also Romanized as Āḩmadābād-e E‘temād ol Dowleh and Āḩmadābād-e E‘temād ed Dowleh; also known as Āḩmadābād) is a village in Saidabad Rural District, in the Central District of Savojbolagh County, Alborz Province, Iran. At the 2006 census, its population was 301, in 87 families.

References 

Populated places in Savojbolagh County